Àngel Guimerà y Jorge (6 May 1845 or 6 May 1847 or 1849 – 18 July 1924), known also as Ángel Guimerá, was a Spanish Nobel-nominated writer in the Catalan language. His work is known for bringing together under romantic aspects the main elements of realism. He is considered one of the principal representatives of the so-called Renaixença, at the end of the nineteenth century.

Life 
He was born in Santa Cruz de Tenerife, Canary Islands, to a Catalan father and a Canary islander mother. At an early age, Guimerà's family moved to Catalonia, where they settled at his father's birthplace, El Vendrell.

Guimerà wrote a number of popular plays, which were translated into other languages and performed abroad, proving instrumental in the revival of Catalan language as a literary language (Renaixença) in the late 19th and early 20th centuries. By far, the most famous was his realistic drama Terra baixa (Lowlands, also translated as Martha of the Lowlands). Written in 1896, it quickly became an international sensation. The play was translated into 15 different languages and the Spanish translation was presented regularly for a period of thirty years by Enric Borràs's theatre throughout Spain and Latin America. In English, the play received three Broadway productions between 1903 and 1936.

In addition to being a popular stage play, Terra baixa was made into six films, including a silent film in the United States, entitled "Martha of the Lowlands" (1914) and Leni Riefenstahl's Tiefland (1954). Furthermore, it served as the source material for two operas: Eugen d'Albert's German opera Tiefland (1903) and Fernand Le Borne's La Catalane (French).

Playwright Àngel Guimerà was nominated twenty-three times for the Nobel Prize in Literature, though he never won, due to controversy about the political significance of the gesture. He was a candidate for the Nobel Prize in 1904, to be shared with the Provençal writer Frédéric Mistral, in recognition of their contributions to literature in non-official languages. Political pressure from Spain's central government having made this prize impossible, it was eventually awarded to Mistral and to the Spanish language playwright and politician José de Echegaray.

When Guimerà died in 1924, he was offered a state funeral in Barcelona of a proportion which had never been seen before and was laid to rest on the Cemetery of Montjuïc.

In his hometown of Santa Cruz de Tenerife is a theater built in his name (Teatro Guimerá).

Terra baixa
Terra baixa is the story of Marta, a poor girl from Barcelona, who finds herself the young lover to Sebastià, the most important landowner in the Catalan lowlands. Sebastià must marry a woman of prominence to keep his land and inheritance. To squelch gossip of his relationship with Marta but still keep her as his lover, Sebastià marries her off to the unsuspecting Manelic, a young shepherd from the Pyrenees, and sets the newly weds up in the house attached to the town's mill. Marta finds herself torn between her old domineering lover and her new caring husband.

La filla del mar
Another well-known work by Guimerà  is the play La filla del mar (The daughter of the sea, 1900), that recounts the story of Agata (Agate).

Her name is that of a precious stone, in sharp contrast to the contempt in which she is held.

Her uncertain origins, and the fact that she had been born "among Moors" renders her an object of hate, branded as a heretic.

One of the few people who does not exclude her is Baltasanet, who states that "When we are born, we are all Moors". Àgata is perfectly conscious of the fact that she is considered a "nobody" and a "nuisance". "What evil have I done, that everyone despises me?", she asks. The discrimination she faces leads ultimately to her death.

Àgata feels attracted by the sea, which seems to be calling out to her, in the voices of her parents.

For her there is a symbolic opposition between sea and earth, the latter being all about misery and tears, whereas the sea harbours peacefulness and truth. Drowning, for her, would be a return to the 'amniotic fluid' of the sea from which she was born.

Like a sailor, she is strong, brave, and vital. At the same time she is sensitive, and when she finds in Pere Màrtir the affection she had desperately lacked, they are able to connect. She excuses his past as a ladies' man, but, overcome by jealousy, threatens him with death if he relapses.

The story of Àgata involves numerous literary allusions and archetypes, from mythological aquatic characters, to the legend of Sappho committing suicide by throwing herself from a cliff into the sea.

Tributes 
The main theater of Santa Cruz de Tenerife, the oldest on the Canary Islands, is called Teatro Guimerá after this playwright. On the facade of the Museo Municipal de Bellas Artes de Santa Cruz de Tenerife are a number of marble busts representing famous tinerfeños, among them Àngel Guimerà.

Avenida Ángel Guimerá, where the theater is located, is also named after the playwright and poet, as this was the street on which he was born.

A seated bronze statue of Àngel Guimerà was made in Catalonia in 1920 by Josep Cardona i Furró (1878-1923). This original model was then expanded by Josep Maria Codina for Barcelona's Plaça del Pi in 1983. Two replicas were made of this statue, one of which was gifted to the town of El Vendrell (in the province of Tarragona) in 1986. The other is located opposite the stated Teatro Guimerá in Santa Cruz de Tenerife.

He was also named adopted son of Barcelona in 1909.

Notes

References

External links

 Àngel Guimerà website in Catalan with English translation.
 
 Liebesketten an opera by Eugen d'Albert based on Guimera's La filla del mar, translated by Rudolf Lothar; Score from Sibley Music Library Digital Scores Collection

1840s births
1924 deaths
People from Santa Cruz de Tenerife
Renaixença writers
Spanish male writers
People from Baix Penedès
Burials at Montjuïc Cemetery